Fenclofenac  is a nonsteroidal anti-inflammatory drug (NSAID) previously used in rheumatism. It has mild immunosuppressive effects and may displace thyroid hormone from its binding protein. It can also cause lichen planus.

Due to its side effects it was withdrawn from the UK and US in the 1980s.

References

Nonsteroidal anti-inflammatory drugs